Shirley Hampton married name Shirley Pirie (born 1935), is a female former athlete who competed for England.

Athletics career
She represented England and won a silver medal in the 4 x 110 yards relay and a bronze medal in the 220 yards at the 1954 British Empire and Commonwealth Games in Vancouver, Canada.

Other achievements include a bronze 1954 at the European Athletics Championships in Bern and English champion over 440 yards in 1958.

Personal life
She married the English Olympic silver medallist long-distance runner and coach (Douglas Alistair) Gordon Pirie (1931-1991) in 1956 and became Shirley Pirie.  There were two daughters of the marriage, Joanne and Sara.  The couple separated in 1978.

References

1935 births
English female sprinters
Athletes (track and field) at the 1954 British Empire and Commonwealth Games
Commonwealth Games medallists in athletics
Commonwealth Games silver medallists for England
Commonwealth Games bronze medallists for England
Living people
Medallists at the 1954 British Empire and Commonwealth Games